Silver Into Gold is the debut studio album by German singer and songwriter Ann Sophie. It was released in Germany on 24 April 2015, through Polydor and Island. The album has peaked to number 82 on the German Albums Chart. The album includes the singles "Jump the Gun" and "Black Smoke".

Singles
On 2 March 2015 she released the two singles "Jump the Gun" and "Black Smoke". Ann Sophie was revealed as one of the ten undiscovered German artists competing for the wildcard spot in Unser Song für Österreich. She performed the song "Jump the Gun" and was selected as the wildcard winner after receiving 24.1% of the vote. She competed in Unser Song für Österreich with the songs "Jump the Gun" and "Black Smoke". The latter of the two advanced to the final round of voting where it placed as the runner-up behind Andreas Kümmert and his song "Heart of Stone". However, Kümmert later declined the opportunity to represent Germany in the Eurovision Song Contest, and Ann Sophie was awarded with the chance. She performed in the final on May 23, 2015 at the Wiener Stadthalle in Vienna, Austria with the song "Black Smoke", scoring zero points after the voting.

Track listing

Chart performance

Release history

References

2015 debut albums
Ann Sophie albums
Island Records albums
Polydor Records albums